El Granada is a village and census-designated place (CDP) in the coastal area of northern San Mateo County, California, United States. The population was 5,481 at the 2020 census. The village is named for the city of Granada, Spain.

Geography
Neighboring towns include Montara and Moss Beach to the north and Half Moon Bay to the south.

Demographics

2010
The 2010 United States Census reported that El Granada had a population of 5,467. The racial makeup of El Granada was 4,608 (84.3%) White, 45 (0.8%) African American, 38 (0.7%) Native American, 190 (3.5%) Asian, 5 (0.1%) Pacific Islander, 336 (6.1%) from other races, and 245 (4.5%) from two or more races. Hispanic or Latino of any race were 813 persons (14.9%).

The Census reported that 5,453 people (99.7% of the population) lived in households, 14 (0.3%) lived in non-institutionalized group quarters, and 0 (0%) were institutionalized.

There were 2,098 households, out of which 660 (31.5%) had children under the age of 18 living in them, 1,245 (59.3%) were opposite-sex married couples living together, 163 (7.8%) had a female householder with no husband present, 69 (3.3%) had a male householder with no wife present.  There were 132 (6.3%) unmarried opposite-sex partnerships, and 33 (1.6%) same-sex married couples or partnerships. 420 households (20.0%) were made up of individuals, and 124 (5.9%) had someone living alone who was 65 years of age or older. The average household size was 2.60.  There were 1,477 families (70.4% of all households); the average family size was 3.00.

The population was spread out, with 1,199 people (21.9%) under the age of 18, 314 people (5.7%) aged 18 to 24, 1,269 people (23.2%) aged 25 to 44, 2,106 people (38.5%) aged 45 to 64, and 579 people (10.6%) who were 65 years of age or older.  The median age was 44.5 years. For every 100 females, there were 96.4 males.  For every 100 females age 18 and over, there were 95.3 males.

The homeowner vacancy rate was 0.7%; the rental vacancy rate was 4.0%.  4,205 people (76.9% of the population) lived in owner-occupied housing units and 1,248 people (22.8%) lived in rental housing units.

2000
As of the census of 2000, there were 5,724 people, 2,028 households, and 1,512 families residing in the CDP. The racial makeup of the CDP in 2010 was 77.0% non-Hispanic White, 0.6% non-Hispanic African American, 0.3% Native American, 3.4% Asian, 0.1% Pacific Islander, 0.3% from other races, and 3.3% from two or more races. Hispanic or Latino of any race were 14.9% of the population.

There were 2,028 households, out of which 39.3% had children under the age of 18 living with them, 61.8% were married couples living together, 8.2% had a female householder with no husband present, and 25.4% were non-families. 17.8% of all households were made up of individuals, and 2.9% had someone living alone who was 65 years of age or older.  The average household size was 2.82 and the average family size was 3.18.

In the CDP, the population was spread out, with 26.8% under the age of 18, 6.0% from 18 to 24, 31.7% from 25 to 44, 29.1% from 45 to 64, and 6.4% who were 65 years of age or older.  The median age was 38 years. For every 100 females, there were 102.1 males.  For every 100 females age 18 and over, there were 99.8 males.

The median income for a household in the CDP was $91,979, and the median income for a family was $96,095. Males had a median income of $54,122 versus $48,065 for females. The per capita income for the CDP was $38,832.  About 1.1% of families and 3.0% of the population were below the poverty line, including 3.0% of those under age 18 and 7.3% of those age 65 or over.

History 
El Granada's unusual concentric-circular street layout was designed by the influential architect and city planner Daniel Burnham.  Burnham's other works included overseeing the design for the 1893 Columbian Exposition in Chicago and designing the 1902 Flatiron Building in New York City.  Burnham's plan was commissioned by the Ocean Shore Railroad, which developed El Granada as a seaside resort for visitors who would use the railroad to travel between San Francisco and El Granada. The city was originally named "Granada" after the city in Spain but the Post Office mistakenly recorded the name as "El Granada" in 1909. Financial difficulties and the advent of the automobile caused the railroad to abandon the plan, and El Granada subsequently became a residential community.

Government

Transportation
Primary road access is via State Route 1 (the Cabrillo Highway) from the north and south.

SamTrans route and 117 provide service to El Granada with service from Linda Mar in Pacifica to Half Moon Bay.

References

External links
 Coastsider, Coastal San Mateo County news site

Populated coastal places in California
Census-designated places in San Mateo County, California
Census-designated places in California